Naval Base Iwo Jima was a naval base built by United States Navy on the Japanese Volcano Island of Iwo Jima during and after the Battle of Iwo Jima, that started on February 19, 1945. The naval base was built to support the landings on Iwo Jima; the troops fighting on Iwo Jima; and the repair and expansion of the airfields on Iwo Jima. United States Navy Seabee built all the facilities on the island.

History
With the landings on Iwo Jima, Seabees' first task was to get cargo and vehicles on the island. Amphibious vehicles, Amphibious crafts, barges and amphibious ships were used to get cargo onto the beaches. Beach unloading was difficult due to the surf and sand. Marston Mats were laid to help jeeps and DUKWs onto the beach. Once the beach was secured Seabees built ship dock at the western beach. On the west beach, old ships were sunk to make a breakwater. Both old ships and concrete barges were sunk to make an artificial breakwater to form a harbor. Some of ships sunk were seized from Empire of Japan like the Toyotu Maru. Some were old Soviet Union ships like: Chetvertyi Krabalov, Caliche, and Gilyak. Other ships sunk were US Concrete Barge No. 30 and other concrete Barges. The last ship, the 12th was sunk on June 13, 1945. On the west beach a small harbor was built to support a small boats. The other high priorities for the Seabees were fresh water and the repair and expansion of the airfields on Iwo Jima. Japanese had made 14 wells on the island, the Seabees used eight wells to build a fresh water system including water tanks. Cisterns and new wells were added to the system. The United States Seventh Fleet Command Headquarters move to Iwo Jima in newly built buildings. After clearing land mines, the Seabees built a Radar station on Mount Suribachi and built a road to the top.

Facilities
Facilities built by the Seabee:
West beach harbor, built with sunk ships 
East boat basin 
Piers and quay walls
DUKW west beach landings with mats
Landing beaches with mats
Water supply system, with tanks and water distillation
Ammunition depot 
Quartermaster depot
Medical center
Engineering camp
Chemical Engineering Camp
Power stations
Crash boat base
27,000 cubic feet refrigerated depot
Tent camp for 37,000 Troops
Headquarters -quonset huts
Navy Carrier Aircraft Service Unit (CASU) camp and depot
Mess halls - quonsets 
Hospitals: 1,250 beds
38th Field Hospital
41st Station Hospital
232nd General Hospital
Navy dispensaries with 105 beds
Radar station on Mount Suribachi, built road to top.
20 miles of primary roads
40 miles of secondary roads
Tank farms for: Fuel oil, aviation fuel, diesel fuel, gasoline
AA gun emplacements
Navy Communication Center
Post office FPO# 3150 SF Iwo Jima, Kazin Group
East shore quarry
Seabee depot
Hangers

Airfields

The Seabees first repaired the captured airfields. Next for Boeing B-29 Superfortress operation, the Seabees did massive earth works to get some to the needed  runway. A number of Superfortresses made emergency landings as soon as the runway was fixed.

On June 27, 1968, the US departed Central Field and gave control over to Japan. Japan used the airfield for as a navigation and weather station. United States Armed Forces use the airport for refueling and some time for US Navy special pilot training.
South Field (also called Motoyama No. 1 and Chidori Field) is the south corner of Iwo Jima. Japan had built two runways, one  and the other . Naval Mobile Construction Battalion 133 did the repair work on the runways. The runway was used by both the United States Army Air Forces and the US Navy. The US Navy's VPB-116 operated PB4Y-1 Liberator as patrol bombers from South Field. Later the PB4Y-1 were replaced by Consolidated PB4Y-2 Privateer aircraft. On September 30, 1955, South Field was closed and turned over to Japan to be abandoned.
North Field (also called Motoyama No. 3) was an incomplete runway built by Japan. Seabees started work on completing the runway, then turned the work over USAAF aviation engineer battalion April 27, 1945. With the war over North Field was used as a depot and then abandoned.

Seabee

Seabee had very high casualties on Iwo Jima. Seabee were given the dangerous task of clearing land mines. Others were hit by enemy fire during unloading or construction.
Unit on Iwo Jima:
31st Seabee battalion attached to the 5th Marine Division
62nd Seabee battalion attached to the 5th Amphibious Corps
133rd Seabee battalion to attached the 4th Marine Division.
Ninth Construction Brigade
90th Seabee battalions
Eighth Regiment: 8th 95th
23rd Special Battalions
Seabee Medical Corps

Geography
Iwo Jima is a small volcanic island south of the Japanese homeland. Seabee built a road to the top of the highest peak, on Iwo Jima, Mount Suribachi on the south point of the island. Most of the remainder of the volcanic island is a flat plateau. Much of the island is covered in volcanic black-gray sand and ash. The soft volcanic ash made the movement of troops and vehicles very difficult. The black beaches have a steep rise to the plateau. Marston Mats were laid on the beaches and into the water to help. The beaches have a sharp dropped off into the ocean, producing a narrow and violent surf zone, difficult for the landing craft. The island had no natural harbors and surf can be heavy at times. The beaches had many disabled crafts and vehicles on the landing D-day. The west beach offered 3 miles of landing beaches and the east shore had 2 miles of landing beaches. Each beach was divided into zones and names of a color. The north beaches were not used as these face a high plateau. Due to the island's small size and lack of a large harbor, it did not become a large base like Tinian Naval Base, where the B-29 Superfortress Enola Gay took off from.

Post war
While fighting ended on March 26, 1945, there were a few Japanese holdouts. They surrendered on January 6, 1949.
 The US closed its last base on the island on June 27, 1968.
Seabee Memorial Iwo Jima at  

Mt. Suribachi Peak Memorial, dedicated to fallen U.S. and Japanese service members at  American Memorial Iwo Jima.

The sunk ship artificial breakwater is still at Iwo Jima. Some of the ships have moved due to Typhoon and rising beaches level, due to volcanic uplift.
Marine Corps War Memorial, a national memorial located in Arlington County, Virginia dedicated in 1954. With iconic 1945 photograph of six Marines raising a U.S. flag.
Iwo Jima Monument West at Marine Corps Base Camp Pendleton.

Gallery

See also

USAAF in the Central Pacific
Planning for the Battle of Iwo Jima
U.S. Naval Base Subic Bay
Espiritu Santo Naval Base
US Naval Advance Bases
Naval Advance Base Saipan

External links

 Battle of Iwo Jima: 19 Feb 1945 – 26 Mar 1945, by C. Peter Chen. The site contains 250 photographs of and about Iwo Jima.
 Iwo Jima, a look back, by Raymond C. Backstrom.
youtube 1945 Invasion Of Iwo Jima Newsreel U.S. Marine Corps Operation Detachment
youtube Invasion Of Iwo Jima
youtube "They Came To An Island" U.S. Navy Civil Engineer Corps Wwii Seabees Construction Battalions 29564
youtube, Seabess Iwo Jima

References

Military installations closed in the 1940s
Closed installations of the United States Navy
Naval Base Iwo Jima
1945 in Japan
Naval Base Iwo Jima